John "Jack" Smales (first ¼ 1888 – fourth ¼ 1930) was an English professional rugby league footballer who played in the 1900s, 1910s and 1920s. He played at representative level for Great Britain (non-test matches), and Yorkshire, and at club level for Outwood Church ARLFC, and Hunslet.

Background
Jack Smales' birth was registered in Wakefield district, West Riding of Yorkshire, England, he was the landlord of The Beehive public house (demolished circa-March 1956), Kirkgate, Wakefield, whilst changing a beer barrel he accidentally came into contact with a live electrical conductor, resulting in death by electrocution, and he died aged 42 in Wakefield district, West Riding of Yorkshire, England.

Playing career

International honours
Jack Smales was selected for 1914 Great Britain Lions tour of Australia and New Zealand while at Hunslet, and played in Great Britain's non-test tour matches including; the 101-0 victory over South Australia on Friday 23 May 1914, and the 10-38 defeat by Metropolis at Sydney Cricket Ground on Saturday 6 June 1914.

All Four Cups, and "The Terrible Six"
Jack Smales was a member of Hunslet's 1907–08 All Four Cups winning team.

Club career
Jack Smales made his début for Hunslet in 1905, and he played his last match for Hunslet against York at Clarence Street, York on Friday 2 April 1920.

References

External links

1888 births
1930 deaths
Accidental deaths by electrocution
Accidental deaths in England
English rugby league players
Great Britain national rugby league team players
Hunslet F.C. (1883) players
Publicans
Rugby league players from Wakefield